The Thorn in the Heart is a 2009 French documentary film directed by Michel Gondry. It was given a special screening at the 2009 Cannes Film Festival and was also screened at the Sheffield Doc/Fest.

Synopsis
The film is a documentary look at the director's family at home in the Cévennes, particularly his aunt Suzette.

Cast
 Suzette Gondry as herself
 Jean-Yves Gondry as himself
 Michel Gondry as himself

References

External links

2009 films
2000s French-language films
French documentary films
Films directed by Michel Gondry
2009 documentary films
Documentary films about families
2000s French films